Visa requirements for Vietnamese citizens are administrative entry restrictions imposed on citizens of Vietnam by the authorities of other states. As of July 2022, Vietnamese citizens had visa-free or visa on arrival access to 54 countries and territories, ranking the Vietnamese passport 90th in terms of travel freedom according to the Henley Passport Index.



Visa requirements map

Visa requirements

Territories, disputed areas and restriction zone

APEC Business Travel Card

Holders of an APEC Business Travel Card (ABTC)  travelling on business do not require a visa to the following countries:

1 – up to 90 days
2 – up to 60 days
3 – up to 59 days

The card must be used in conjunction with a passport and has the following advantages:
undertake legitimate business in participating economies
expedited border crossing in all member economies, including transitional members
expedited scheduling of visa interview (United States)

See also

 Visa policy of Vietnam
 Vietnamese passport

Notes and References
Notes

References

Vietnam
Foreign relations of Vietnam